Nam Sang-wan (born 15 January 1935) is a South Korean former sports shooter. He competed in the 300 metre rifle event at the 1964 Summer Olympics.

References

External links
 

1935 births
Living people
South Korean male sport shooters
Olympic shooters of South Korea
Shooters at the 1964 Summer Olympics
People from Buyeo County
South Korean military personnel
Asian Games medalists in shooting
Shooters at the 1962 Asian Games
Shooters at the 1966 Asian Games
Shooters at the 1970 Asian Games
Shooters at the 1974 Asian Games
Asian Games gold medalists for South Korea
Asian Games silver medalists for South Korea
Asian Games bronze medalists for South Korea
Medalists at the 1962 Asian Games
Medalists at the 1966 Asian Games
Medalists at the 1970 Asian Games
Medalists at the 1974 Asian Games
Sportspeople from South Chungcheong Province
20th-century South Korean people
21st-century South Korean people